Ancylopsetta is a genus of large-tooth flounders mostly found along the Atlantic coast of the Americas with one species found along the Pacific coast.

Species
The currently recognized species in this genus are:
 Ancylopsetta antillarum Gutherz, 1966
 Ancylopsetta cycloidea J. C. Tyler, 1959 (Cyclope flounder)
 Ancylopsetta dendritica C. H. Gilbert, 1890 (three-spot flounder)
 Ancylopsetta dilecta (Goode & T. H. Bean, 1883) (three-eye flounder)
 Ancylopsetta kumperae J. C. Tyler, 1959 (four-eyed flounder)
 Ancylopsetta microctenus Gutherz, 1966
 Ancylopsetta ommata (D. S. Jordan & C. H. Gilbert, 1883) (Gulf of Mexico ocellated flounder)

References

Paralichthyidae
Marine fish genera
Taxa named by Theodore Gill